Duodenal papilla may refer to:

 Major duodenal papilla
 Minor duodenal papilla